Brachystephanus longiflorus is a species of plant in the family Acanthaceae. It is found in Cameroon, Equatorial Guinea, and Nigeria. Its natural habitats are moist lowland or montane forests in subtropical or tropical regions.

References

longiflorus
Vulnerable plants
Taxonomy articles created by Polbot